Syzygys is a Japanese organ-violin duo composed of Hitomi Shimizu on organ and Hiromi Nishida on violin. Formed in 1985, they play "microtonal pop music", specifically just intonation in the form of Harry Partch's 43-tone scale. Nishida studied Arabic style violin with Abdo Dagir.

They have released albums on Tzadik Records, including Syzygys: Complete Studio Recordings (2003, Tzadik #7240). György Ligeti was interested in their music, and he mentions their track "Fauna Grotesque" in a sketch.

References

External links
Website

Microtonal musicians
Tzadik Records artists
Japanese musical duos